Butyl mercaptan may refer to:

 Butanethiol (n-butyl mercaptan)
 tert-Butylthiol (t-butyl mercaptan)